China Western Development, also Great Western Development Strategy or the Open Up the West Program, is a policy adopted for the Western China.

The policy covers 6 provinces (Gansu, Guizhou, Qinghai, Shaanxi, Sichuan and Yunnan), 5 autonomous regions (Guangxi, Inner Mongolia, Ningxia, Tibet and Xinjiang), and 1 municipality (Chongqing). This region contains 71.4% of mainland China's area, but only 28.8% of its population, as of the end of 2002, and 19.9% of its total economic output, as of 2015.

History 
Under the leadership of Deng Xiaoping, the People's Republic of China began to reform its economy in 1978 by changing from a command economy to a market economy. The coastal regions of eastern China benefited greatly from these reforms, and their economies quickly raced ahead. The western half of China, however, lagged behind severely. In March 1999, General-Secretary Jiang Zemin proposed a developmental strategy for the western region at the Ninth National People's Congress. He would elaborate on the plan in June 1999, during which the phrase great western development was used, marking the start of the policy. Premier Zhu Rongji visited the western region to gather western officials' views of the plan. Consequently, the State Planning Commission drafted an early plan for the proposal before submitting it to the Politburo Standing Committee in November 1999. A Leadership Group for Western China Development (西部地区开发领导小组) was created by the State Council in January 2000, led by Zhu.

Chronicle of Events 
 1999: the "Western Development" guidelines are clarified
 2000: the "Western Development" plan begins
 2001: the official website of the "Western Development" program is launched
 2002: construction of the "West-East Gas Pipeline" begins
 2003: the policy of "Returning Grazing Land to Grassland" comes into effect
 2004: the Law on Promoting Western Development is listed on the legislative plan of the 10th National People's Congress
 2005: compulsory education tuition and fees become exempt in western areas
 2006: the Qinghai-Tibet railway begins operation
 2007: the Ministry of Finance invests 280 billion yuan in the west to support key projects
 2009: Formation of the West Triangle Economic Zone

Strategy

The main components of the strategy include the development of infrastructure (transport, hydropower plants, energy, and telecommunications), enticement of foreign investment, increased efforts on ecological protection (such as reforestation), promotion of education, and retention of talent flowing to richer provinces. As of 2006, a total of 1 trillion yuan has been spent building infrastructure in western China.

Transportation 
The western development bureau affiliated to the state council released a list of 10 major projects to launch in 2008, with a combined budget of 436 billion yuan (64.12 billion U.S. dollars).

These projects included new railway lines connecting Guiyang and Guangzhou, Lanzhou and Chongqing, Kashgar and Hotan in Xinjiang; highways between Wanyuan and Dazhou in Sichuan Province, Shuikou and Duyun in Guizhou Province; airport expansion projects in Chengdu, Chongqing and Xi’an.

They also include the building of hydropower stations, coal mines, gas and oil transmission tube lines as well as public utilities projects in western regions.

By the end of 2007, China has started 92 key construction projects in western regions, with a total investment of more than 1.3 trillion yuan. The world-known Qinghai-Tibet railway project set a milestone in Tibet's local development. It connected Tibet with central part of China. Tibet is no longer an isolated area that can not reached by railway.

Hydraulic projects 
The Big Western Line, a possible element of the South–North Water Transfer Project, is a proposal for diverting water from the upstream sections of six rivers in southwestern China, including the Mekong, the Yarlung Tsangpo and the Salween, to the dry areas of northern China through a system of reservoirs, tunnels and natural rivers. This project may be the most controversial plan to date.

Effects

Economic Developments 

China's attempt to develop its western regions has had varying effects on the West's economic development.  While massive investment has boosted the region's output, effectively raising the GDP in all western regions, the project failed to achieve its goal of eliminating the economic gap between China's East and West.

From 1999 to 2001, Xinjiang and Guangxi displayed an annual GDP percent increase of as high as 30%.  China's western regions have reported an annual average economic growth rate of 10.6% for six years in a row.  The combined GDP of the western regions reached 3.33 trillion yuan in 2005, compared with 1.66 trillion yuan in 2000, while net income grew on average 10% for urban residents in the west and 6.8% for rural residents.  Initiatives encouraging Chinese from wealthier and more crowded regions of China to move to the less crowded western regions has resulted in population growth in [a few cities], most notably Qinghai with its increase of 12.6%.

Nevertheless, the economic growth rate of China's East continues to exceed that of the West, causing the western share of domestic product to continue to fall.  The West's contribution to the GDP decreased from 20.88% in 1990 to 17.13% in 2000.  Relative levels of GDP per capita in the West decreased from 73.30% in 1990 to 60.87% in 2000.   In 1990, Shanghai's per capita GDP was 7.3 times that of Guizhou, the poorest province in China; by 2000, the figure had grown to 12.9 times.   Evidence from the China Statistical Yearbook also confirms the increasing economic gap between China's West and East, indicating that the east-to-west GDP ratio increased from 2.98 in 1980 to 4.33 in 2000.

Foreign Investment 

Since the introduction of economic reform and open-door policy in 1978, the western region has been in a disadvantageous economic position because it promises a less lucrative return to the investors than its eastern competitors.  Therefore, one of the major objectives of the Open Up the West initiative was to bring in foreign investment by creating a more stable investing environment through infrastructure construction.  This was a success for the western development project at some level, for statistics shows a substantial growth in foreign investment in the western regions, from US$1,837.35 million in 1999 to $1,922.19 million in 2001.  However, not all areas in the western region shared in this progress.  While foreign direct investment in Chongqing grew US$17.56 million between 1999 and 2001 (from US$238.93 million to $256.49 million), foreign investment in Guizhou, Guangxi and Ningxi declined significantly, dropping about US$19.71, $250.96 million, and $34.54 million respectively.
 
The situation in Guizhou reveals a particularly pernicious effect of the Western Development Program. Despite the fact that Guizhou received 53.3 billion yuan in infrastructure construction in 2001 alone, more than the total amount given by the Ninth Five-Year Plan (1995-2000), its foreign capital declined from US$40.9 million in 1999 to $29.29 million in 2001, an astonishing 31% decline, reaching its lowest point since 1997.  Contrary to what the state had intended, the West-East Electricity Transfer Project in Guizhou only assured the continued increase in foreign investment on the coast, as most of the electricity generated in Guizhou was transmitted to Guangdong.

Tim Oakes, associate professor of geography at the University of Colorado at Boulder, argues that the decline of foreign investment in certain western regions is a consequence of Beijing's attempt to recentralize the province's economy through mega-projects such as Guizhou's west–east electricity transfer project.  The strengthening of central control over the economy has eroded the trust of foreign investors.  In the case of Guizhou, while the Chinese central government intended to attract foreign investment in the power sector through the West-East Electricity Transfer Project, only 5% of foreign investment entered the energy sector. About 75% of Guizhou's foreign investment was channeled into manufacturing and 15% to real estate development.   Because the campaign's economic program is strongly central planned, the campaign has actually discouraged foreign investment, working against its original intent.

Environmental Protection 

Foreseeing significant environmental impacts in the massive infrastructure development program, the state highly publicizes environmental preservation in its campaign to open up the West.  Farmland conversion to forest and grassland is the dominant strategy for this effort, targeting specifically the regions crucial to the Yangtze's protection.  In Sichuan, the government aims to protect the 19.23 million hectares of existing forest and plant an additional 2.93 million hectares of new forest to diminish the amount of silt flowing into the Yangtze. Around 20,000 mu of farmland was converted in Guizhou in 2001, a key region for Yangtze preservation.  In Shaanxi, 571,000 hectares of farmland and 427,000 hectares of wasteland were converted to forest or grass between 1999 and 2002.  Another 280,000 hectares of farmland and the same expanse of wasteland were converted in 2003. China's environmental program in the west has made China “one of a few countries in the world that have been rapidly increasing their forest cover,” according to David Dollar, director of the World Bank in China.

Although the project seems to be going successfully, it creates a potential fiscal burden for the government.  Massive farmland conversion requires a tremendous amount of funding for resettling the farmers.  In addition, to compensate farmers for their loss in agricultural profit, the state has committed to supplying them with grains and funds for planting trees and grass.  This results in a prescribed allotment of 60 yuan per mu by the central policy.  A further complication is farmer dissatisfaction when the government fails to deliver on its contract, since the local government usually bases compensation on actual production value, resulting in compensation between 20 and 50 yuan, plus a 300 jin appropriation of grain.

Farmers who are temporarily benefiting from the compensation will soon rely on governmental subsidy once the tree-planting project is completed. 81,000 tons of grain, 154 million yuan in cash subsidies and 266 million yuan for tree saplings to almost 800,000 farming households have already been spent in Shaanxi.  If the provincial government decides to honor its commitment for another 5–8 years, it will cost a total of 11.7 billion yuan in grain and cash subsidies.  The heavy financial cost makes the sustainability of the environmental project questionable.

Furthermore, while the environmental project is critically emphasized in the campaign, very little has been discussed on the impact of intensified coal extraction, increased thermal plant operation, reservoir inundation, and transportation and transmission line construction, all of which create a more detrimental impact to the environment that the environmental program can compensate for.

See also 
Bohai Economic Rim
Yangtze River Delta Economic Zone
Northeast China Revitalization
Rise of Central China Plan
Economy of China
West Triangle Economic Zone

References

Further reading 
 Asia Times Online: Asphalt net covers China's west
 China's Campaign to 'Open up the West'National, Provincial and Local Perspectives, The China Quarterly Special Issues (No. 5), Edited by David S. G. Goodman

External links 
 China Western Development Network

Economic development in China